The  Pyrobac-1 RNA motif is a conserved RNA structure discovered by bioinformatics.  RNAs conforming to this motif have been found only in Pyrobaculum, a genus of archaea.  Instances of the motif are hypothesized to function as non-coding RNAs. The motif has been shown to be part of sRNA202 and sRNA203 canonical and noncanonical pseudouridine guide RNAs (H/ACA RNA) in Pyrobaculum.

References

External links
 

Non-coding RNA